The National Commission for Protection of Child Rights (NCPCR) is an Indian statutory body established by an Act of Parliament, the Commission for Protection of Child Rights (CPCR) Act, 2005. The Commission works under the aegis of Ministry of Women and Child Development, GoI. The Commission became operational on 5 March 2007.

The Commission is mandated under section 13 of CPCR Act, 2005 "to ensure that all Laws, Policies, Programmes, and Administrative Mechanisms are in consonance with the Child Rights perspective as enshrined in the Constitution of India and the UN Convention on the Rights of the Child." As defined by the commission, child includes person up to the age of 18 years.

Eligibility of members
The commission consist of the following members namely:-
 A chairperson who, is  a person of eminence and has done an outstanding work for promoting  the welfare of children; and
 Six members, out of which at least two are woman, from the following fields, is appointed by the Central Government from amongst person of eminence, ability, integrity, standing and experience in,-
Education;
Child health, care, welfare or child development;
Juvenile justice or care of neglected or marginalized children or children with disabilities; 
Elimination of child labour or children in distress;
Child psychology or sociology; 
Laws relating to children.

Functions and powers
The functions of NCPCR are-

 Examine and review the safeguards provided by or under any law for the time being in force for the protection of child rights and recommend measures for their effective implementation;
 Present to be central government, annually and at such other intervals, as the commission may deem fit, reports upon working of those safeguards;
 Inquire into violation of child rights and recommend initiation of proceedings in such cases;
 Examine all factors that inhibit the enjoyment of rights of children affected by terrorism, communal violence, riots, natural disaster, domestic violence, HIV/AIDS, trafficking, maltreatment, torture and exploitation, pornography and prostitution and recommend appropriate remedial measures;
 Look into the matters relating to the children in need of special care and protection including children in distress, marginalized and disadvantaged children, children in conflict with law, juveniles children without family and children of prisoners and recommend appropriate remedial measures;
 Study treaties and other international instruments and undertake periodical review of existing policies, programmes and other activities on child rights and make recommendations for their effective implementation in the best interest of children;
 Undertake and promote research in the field of child rights;
 Spread child rights literacy among various section of society and promote awareness of the safeguards available for protection of these rights through publications, the media, seminar and other available means;
 Inspect or cause to be inspected any juveniles custodial home, or any other place of residence or institution meant for children, under the control of the Central Government or any State Government or any other authority, including any institution run by a social organization; Where children are detained or lodged for the purpose of treatment, reformation or protection and take up with  these authorities for remedial action, if found necessary;
 Inquire into complaints and take suo motu notice of matter relating to :
 Deprivation and violation of child rights;
 Non implementation of laws providing for protection and development of children;
 Non compliance of policy decisions, guidelines or instructions aimed at mitigating hardships to and ensuring welfare of the children and provide relief to such children;
 Or take up the issues rising out of such matters with appropriate authorities.
 Such other functions as it may consider necessary for the promotion of Child Rights and any other matter incidental to the above function.a state commission or any other commission duly constituted under any law for the time being in force.
 The Commission shall not enquire into any matter which is pending before a State Commission or any other Commission duly constituted under any law for the time being in force.
 Analyse existing law, policy and practice to assess compliance with Convention on the rights of the Child, undertake inquiries and produce reports on any aspects of policy or practice affecting children and comment on proposed new legislation related to child rights.
 Present to the Central Government annually and at such other intervals as the Commission may deem fit, reports upon the working of those safeguards.
 Undertake formal investigation where concern has been expressed either by children themselves or by concerned person on their behalf.
 Promote, respect and serious consideration of the views of children in its work and in that of all Government Departments and Organisations dealing with Child.
 Produce and disseminate information about child rights.
 Compile and analyse data on children.
 Promote the incorporation of child rights into the school curriculum, training of teachers or personnel dealing with children.

https://ncpcr.gov.in/annual-report 
Providing Care & Protection to the children living in Street Situations
Care and Protection to the children being orphaned due to Covid or lost have lost a parent
Monitoring of Child Care Institutions (CCIs)
Taking cognizance of any matter with regard to violation of rights of the child 
review of laws related to children and give feedback to the Union Government
Social Media Campaign on issues pertaining to the rights of the child.
Formulation of Interdepartmental Joint Action Plan to prevent drug and substance abuse among children and illicit trafficking 
Ensuring the Right to Education for every child.

Findings
The above said recommendations were based on a survey involving 6,632 students. All of them replied to have been harassed. 75% of them informed of being beaten. 69% did get slaps on their face. 0.4% were given electric shocks by the teachers.

Main recommendations
Seminars should be conducted for teachers to improve their teaching styles. The dignity of a student should be accepted by everyone. Drug addiction, copying, violence etc. should be curtailed.  State Commissions of Protection of Child Rights should be established.

Schemes

 GHAR Portal:
 National Commission for Protection of Child Rights (NCPCR) has developed and launched the portal GHAR - Go Home and Reunite, with the sole purpose of restoration and repatriation of children. The GHAR portal has been developed to digitally monitor and track the restoration and repatriation of children.

List of Chairpersons
(1) Shanta Sinha (2007–2013)https://www.thehindu.com/news/national/Shantha-Sinha-gets-second-term-as-NCPCR-chairperson/article16300050.ece
(2) Kushal Singh (2013–14)
(3) Stuti Narain Kacker (2015–2018)
(4) Priyank Kanoongo (2018–Incumbent)  2021 https://www.indianmandarins.com/news/kanoongo-is-chairperson,-ncpcr/16956

See also
Constitution of India
UN Convention on the Rights of the Child
Odisha State Child Protection Society

References

External links
 NCPCR website

Indian commissions and inquiries
Children's rights in India
2007 establishments in Delhi
Government agencies established in 2007